El Salvador participated at the 2018 Summer Youth Olympics in Buenos Aires, Argentina from 6 October to 18 October 2018.

Athletics

Badminton

El Salvador qualified one player based on the Badminton Junior World Rankings.

Singles

Team

References

2018 in Salvadoran sport
Nations at the 2018 Summer Youth Olympics
El Salvador at the Youth Olympics